The Ministry of Health of the Republic of Lithuania is a government department of the Republic of Lithuania. Its operations are authorized by the Constitution of the Republic of Lithuania, decrees  issued by the President and Prime Minister, and laws passed by the Seimas (Parliament). Its mission is to seek national unity and continue to build a state of wellbeing for all, where everyone could lead a dignified, comfortable, safe and healthy life. The current head of the Ministry is Arūnas Dulkys.

Ministers

References

 
Health
Lithuania